Store Heddinge Church also known as Saint Katharina Church (Danish: Store Heddinge Kirke or Sankt Katharina Kirke) is an octagonal church in the town of Store Heddinge on the Danish island of Zealand. Thought to have been built of limestone in the late 12th century by King Valdemar I, the unusual octagonal Romanesque nave and the choir were later extended with lateral Gothic additions, including the tower.

Gallery

References

12th-century churches in Denmark
Churches in Stevns Municipality
Churches in the Diocese of Roskilde
Lutheran churches converted from Roman Catholicism
Gothic architecture in Denmark
Octagonal churches